According to Ghana’s Forestry officials, the big tree near the town of Akim Oda which is  tall and  in diameter is believed to be the biggest tree ever discovered in Ghana and West Africa. It is a member of the species Tieghemella heckelii.

The tree is known to be between 350 and 400 years old, and  has a low natural generational success rate which is a contributory factor to its likelihood of extinction.

History 
There are many spiritual myths about the discovery of the tree. It is believed that the tree was discovered by Yaw Andoh a hunter named from Akim Asanteman, several years ago.

Beliefs 
The tree serves as a heritage object and also a spiritual object. There is a belief there could be some spiritual powers behind it. This has led many visiting the tree to perform sacrifices and prayer as well as offer gifts to it. It is also believed that the tree is able to heal a sick person who visits the site to perform the necessary rituals. Others also are of the view that infertile women are able to conceive when they use the leaves and the bark of the tree as herbs

Tourism 
The tree has a thick grey bark and is cylindrical. It is also longitudinally ridged with slash bright pink leaves which attracts tourists.

The tree has attracted many people from different parts of the world, especially Indian and Asia continents.

References

Individual trees